The Caird Park Velodrome is an outdoor  concrete velodrome in Dundee, Scotland. Adjacent to the velodrome is an athletics stadium with a  running track, 18- and 9-hole golf courses, several football pitches and a rugby pitch, whilst in the centre of the velodrome is a football pitch, as it is one of two major outdoor sport complexes in the city. 

In 2012 Sport Scotland spent £300,000 on redevelopment of the velodrome.  

The velodrome is home to the Discovery Juniors Cycling Club, which Scottish gold medal cyclist Mark Stewart was a member of. Since his gold medal win at the 2018 Commonwealth Games in the Gold Coast, Australia, there have been calls for the velodrome to be renamed after him.

Had Scotland and Ireland's UEFA Euro 2008 bid been successful, a new stadium would have been built in Caird Park.

References

External links
 information at FixedGearFever.com

Velodromes in Scotland
Sports venues in Dundee